Kihara is a Japanese surname. Notable people with this surname include:

People
, Japanese geneticist
, Japanese politician
, Japanese footballer
, Japanese swimmer and TV actress
Minoru Kihara, multiple people
, Japanese table tennis player
, Japanese engineer
, Japanese composer, pianist, music educator
, Japanese pair skater
, Japanese politician
, Japanese politician
Shigeyuki Kihara, Japanese-Samoan artist
, Japanese manga artist

Fictional characters 
Nayuta Kihara, Gensei Kihara, Therestina Kihara Lifeline, Kagun Kihara, Amata Kihara and many others, characters in the light novel series A Certain Magical Index
Tsumugu Kihara, one of the main characters of Nagi no Asukara

Japanese-language surnames